Well Done may refer to:

Film
Well Done, Henry, a 1936 British comedy film directed by Wilfred Noy and starring Will Fyffe
Well Done (1994 film), a documentary by Thomas Imbach
Well Done (2003 film), a Tamil film
Well Done (2016 film) (Italian: A Regola d'Arte), a 2016 Italian dramatic short film directed by Riccardo Di Gerlando.

Music
Well-Done (album), by Action Bronson
Well Done, a 1973 album by T-Bone Walker
Well Done (mixtape), by Tyga
Well Done 2, a mixtape by Tyga
Well Done 3, a mixtape by Tyga
"Well Done", a song by Idles
"Well Done", a song by The Afters